Haemanota croceicorpus is a moth of the family Erebidae first described by Hervé de Toulgoët in 1990. It is found in South America.

References

 

Haemanota
Moths described in 1990